The Hi-Point Model JCP is a blowback operated semi-automatic pistol chambered for the .40 S&W round.

Design
The model JCP has a polymer frame like all Hi-Point pistols, a 4.5 inch barrel, and a slide composed of ZAMAK-3  with steel reinforcements.

It features an integral accessory rail for mounting lasers and flashlights on Hi-Point rings. The safety is a combination lever for locking the slide and blocking the sear movement. The immediate drawback of this system is that the weapon cannot be cocked while the safety is on; the safety locks the trigger/sear. 

Hi-point's handguns use a blowback design similar to that used in the Walther PPK and Russian Makarov PM. In blowback firearms, the return spring and mass of the slide absorb the rearward force generated by the propulsion of the bullet. As the slide moves back, an extractor hooks the empty casing and pulls it out of the chamber after which the case is ejected from the firearm. When the slide has completed its rearward travel, the recoil spring moves the slide forward, chambering another round. Many modern handguns use a locked-breech design and therefore do not require the amount of mass that the blowback design requires in order to remain safe to fire, comfortable to shoot, and easy to control during the firing process.

Criticism
One frequent point of criticism is the substantial size and weight of the weapon. However, at 35 ounces with a 4.5" barrel, the firearm, with its 10+1 capacity, is the same size as the Colt M1911A1 .45ACP with its 35 oz. weight and 7+1 capacity, which many consider to be concealable, while the 40SW is 0.75 inches shorter in length and only 0.1 inches wider. The larger slide also helps to make blowback operation possible.

The firing pin in this design also acts as the ejector. It is possible to have a 'out of battery detonation' while hand cycling live ammo through the gun due to this. This means that it is not safe to hand cycle live ammo through the gun and care is taken while unloading it.

Features
+P rating to handle all factory ammunition 
Polymer frame with an integral accessory rail
Black powder coat finish
Three-dot sights, fully adjustable rear sight (windage and elevation adjustable); optional ghost ring sight 
Quick on and off thumb safety
Magazine disconnect safety
Last round hold open

See also
 Hi-Point CF-380
 Hi-Point C-9 and C-9 Comp
 Hi-Point .45 ACP
 Hi-Point Carbine

References

Semi-automatic pistols of the United States
.40 S&W semi-automatic pistols